Shimla Municipal Corporation (SMC) is the municipal corporation of Shimla, the capital of Himachal Pradesh, and is the chief nodal agency for the administration of the city. Municipal Corporation mechanism in India was introduced during British Rule with formation of municipal corporation in Madras (Chennai) in 1688, later followed by municipal corporations in Bombay (Mumbai) and Calcutta (Kolkata) by 1762. Shimla Municipal Corporation is headed by Mayor of city and governed by Commissioner. Shimla Municipal Corporation has been formed with functions to improve the infrastructure of town.

Overview
Established in 1851, the Shimla Municipal Corporation is an elected body comprising 34 councilors (28 until 2017), five of whom are nominated by the Government of Himachal Pradesh. The nominations are based on prominence in the fields of social service, academics and other activities. Fifty percent of seats are reserved for women. The elections take place every five years and the mayor and deputy mayor are elected by and amongst the councilors themselves. Satya Kaundal and Shalinder Chauhan of BJP are the present Mayor and Deputy Mayor respectively. The two major political parties are the Bharatiya Janata Party and Indian National Congress. Communist Party of India (Marxist) has been nearing extinction with just 1 member in current corporation. The administrative head of the corporation is the Municipal Commissioner who is appointed by the state government. Raipur Municipal Corporation has been formed with functions to improve the infrastructure of town.

Revenue sources 
The following are the Income sources for the corporation from the Central and State Government.

Revenue from taxes 
Following is the Tax related revenue for the corporation.

 Property tax.
 Profession tax.
 Entertainment tax.
 Grants from Central and State Government like Goods and Services Tax.
 Advertisement tax.

Revenue from non-tax sources 
Following is the Non Tax related revenue for the corporation.

 Water usage charges.
 Fees from Documentation services.
 Rent received from municipal property.
 Funds from municipal bonds.

List of wards
There are 41 wards in MC Shimla area.

Corporation elections

Election 2017

Election 2022

See also 
 List of municipal corporations in India

References

1851 establishments in India
Organizations established in 1851
Municipal corporations in Himachal Pradesh
Municipal corporations in India
Local government in Himachal Pradesh